Christine Elizabeth Abrahamsen (September 6, 1916 – February 7, 1995) was an American nurse and professor of nursing at West Virginia University Institute of Technology.  She wrote science fiction and gothic novels under the pseudonyms Christabel and Kathleen Westcott, respectively.

Early life and nursing career 
Christine Elizabeth Abrahamsen was born on September 6, 1916 in Oak Hill, West Virginia, the daughter of Charles Earl Campbell, an auto mechanic, and Macie Boothe.  She was raised and attended school in West New York, New Jersey.  She earned a nursing diploma from New York's Somerset Hospital in 1938, a bachelor's degree in nursing education from Hunter College in 1954, and a master's degree in nursing from Columbia University in 1959.  After working as a nurse in various hospitals in New Jersey and New York since 1938, she became a professor of nursing at West Virginia University Institute of Technology in 1971.

Writing 

Abrahamsen began writing "in earnest" in 1968, describing the appeal of science fiction by commenting that "after many years of graduate study and research it was a pleasure to write something which needed absolutely no documentation".  She said she took the pen name Christabel from "a fortune telling book... it means 'good luck' and success."  Her first two works were the Veltakin series of planetary romances, Manalacor of Veltakin and The Cruachan and the Killane.  The Encyclopedia of Science Fiction describes her work as "written in a style that crosses the romance genre with boys' fiction".  Psychic phenomena play a significant role in her work, based on her interest in the topic and her study with the Rosicrucians.

Bibliography

As Christabel 
 Manalacor of Veltakin (New York: Curtis Books, 1970)
 The Cruachan and the Killane (New York: Curtis Books, 1970)
 The Mortal Immortals (New York: Walker, 1971)
 The Golden Olive (New York: Curtis Books, 1972)

As Kathleen Westcott 
 Bride of Kilkerran (New York: Pocket Books, 1972)

Death 
Abrahamsen died on February 7, 1995, in Charleston, West Virginia.

References 

1916 births
1995 deaths
20th-century American novelists
20th-century American women educators
20th-century American educators
20th-century American women writers
20th-century pseudonymous writers
American science fiction writers
American women nurses
Columbia University School of Nursing alumni
Hunter College alumni
Novelists from West Virginia
Nurses from New York (state)
Nurses from West Virginia
People from Oak Hill, West Virginia
People from West New York, New Jersey
Pseudonymous women writers
West Virginia University Institute of Technology faculty
Writers of Gothic fiction